"Forever Young" is a song recorded by South Korean girl group Blackpink, serving as the second track in the group's first mini-album Square Up. It was written and produced by Teddy and Future Bounce. A Japanese version of the song was included in the group's first Japanese compilation album, Blackpink in Your Area (2018).

Following its release, "Forever Young" was a commercial success, peaking at number two in South Korea. It sold over 2,500,000 digital downloads and became the group's second song to receive a platinum certification from the Korea Music Content Association (KMCA). In Japan, it was certified silver by the RIAJ for surpassing 30 million streams in the country.

Background and composition
The song was recorded in 2015, before Blackpink's official debut in August 2016. An Instagram video dated from November 15, 2015, resurfaced following the official release of the song, showing a 2NE1 fan fortuitously recording a snippet of the then unknown track from the outside of YG Entertainment's building in Seoul. The video features members Rosé and Lisa singing their lines from the first verse.

"Forever Young" was written and produced by Teddy and Future Bounce. It runs for three minutes and fifty-seven seconds. Tamar Herman of Billboard  characterized "Forever Young" as a beachy, moombahton-based song, within which they declare that Blackpink is "the revolution". She also noted the use of English-language profanity in the song, which she called a rarity in music put out by K-pop girl groups.

Japanese version
Blackpink's first Japanese compilation album, Blackpink in Your Area, was released digitally on November 23, 2018, and physically on December 5, the album included the Japanese-language version of "Forever Young".

Commercial performance
Upon release, the song quickly reached number 2 on real-time charts in South Korea. The song peaked at number 2 on the Gaon Digital Chart and charted in the top 100 for 25 weeks. It also peaked at number 2, 4, 10 and 36 on the K-pop Hot 100, the Billboard World Digital Song Sales chart, the RMNZ Hot Singles chart and Billboard Japan Hot 100 respectively. The song was certified platinum for download and streaming by Gaon, for reaching 2.5 million digital downloads and 100 million streams, respectively.

Promotion and live performances
On June 20, 2018, the dance practice video for "Forever Young" was released on Blackpink's official YouTube channel. As of February 2021 it has over 170 million views and 2.8 million likes on YouTube. Forever Young was featured on the setlist of Blackpink Arena Tour in Japan and Blackpink World Tour [In Your Area]. During the 2018 SBS Gayo Daejeon, held on December 25, 2018, Blackpink performed a medley of "Solo", "Ddu-Du Ddu-Du" and "Forever Young". On February 12, 2019, Blackpink performed "Forever Young" alongside Ddu-Du Ddu-Du on Good Morning America and on January 23, 2019, at the 8th Gaon Chart Music Awards. The song was performed during the group's performance at Coachella Valley Music and Arts Festival 2019 as a part of their 11-song setlist.

Accolades

Credits and personnel
Credits adapted from Tidal.
Personnel

Blackpink - Vocals
Teddy -  Lyricist, composer, arranger
Future Bounce - Composer, arranger
R.Tee - Arranger

Charts

Weekly charts

Monthly charts

Year-end charts

Certifications

See also
List of certified songs in South Korea

References

2018 songs
Blackpink songs
Moombahton songs
Songs written by Teddy Park